KWMX (96.7 FM, "96.7 The Wolf") is a radio station licensed to Williams, Arizona and serving the Flagstaff–Prescott, Arizona area. Owned by Stone Canyon Media Group, the station broadcasts a classic rock format.

History
KWMX signed on in 1998 broadcasting an oldies music format branded as "Cool 96.7". The station was licensed to Jana Tucker but purchased by Red Rock Communications for $421,400. The station, along with KSED and KBTK was purchased by Grenax Broadcasting II in 2006 for $5.025 Million.  On July 1, 2006, it switched to classic rock as "96.7 The Wolf".

On September 24, 2018, Grenax Broadcasting II, LLC announced plans to sell KWMX to Stone Canyon Media Group; the purchase was completed in December.

References

External links
 

WMX
Classic rock radio stations in the United States